VietJet Aviation Joint Stock Company, trading as VietJet Air (or simply Vietjet), is an international low-cost airline from Vietnam. It was the first privately-owned new-age airline to be established in Vietnam, being granted its initial approval to operate by the Vietnamese Minister of Finance in November 2007. As of its launch in December 2011, it became the second private airline to offer domestic service in Vietnam, as well as the fifth airline overall to offer civil domestic flights. VietJet Air is owned by Sovico Holdings, HDBank, other organisational investors, and individual stakeholders.

The carrier's launch was beset by long delays attributed to various causes, such as a global economic slowdown and regulatory issues.  Despite the setbacks, VietJet Air's first flight was operated on 25 December 2011, flying from Ho Chi Minh City to Hanoi. The carrier carried its 10 millionth passenger in December 2014, and the 25 millionth passenger in December 2015.

History

Foundation delays
The airline has its head office in the Vạn Phúc Diplomatic Corps in Ba Đình district, Hanoi It was the first privately-owned airline to be established in Vietnam, and as of its launch in December 2011, it became the second private airline (after Air Mekong) to offer domestic service in Vietnam, as well as the fifth airline overall not counting Indochina Airlines, which ceased operations in November 2009 to offer civil domestic flights, after Vietnam Airlines, Pacific Airlines, Air Mekong and the Vietnam Air Service Company (VASCO). In its initial plan, the Hanoi-based airline stated its intention to offer flights to Ho Chi Minh City and Da Nang, gradually expanding its network to include other Asian destinations, such as Hong Kong, Bangkok, Singapore, and cities in southern China. The airline's president and CEO is Nguyen Thi Phuong Thao from December 2011.

Initially, VietJet had shown the intention to commence flights in late 2008 or early 2009. Throughout the next few years, the expected launch date was repeatedly pushed back, first to late 2009, then mid-2010. Airline officials gave different reasons for the delays, including increased fuel prices and other financial problems, as well as unresolved branding conflicts with the Civil Aviation Administration of Vietnam (CAAV).

Although Malaysian budget carrier AirAsia announced in February 2010 that it planned to purchase a 30% stake in the airline through a joint venture agreement, the carrier rescinded its plans in October 2011, citing "a failure to obtain Vietnamese regulatory approvals". 

By February 2011, VietJet was said to be "completing final stages" prior to launch before its operation license expired in June. The airline's maiden flight was eventually launched on 25 December 2011, flying from Ho Chi Minh City to Hanoi.

Operations
The Vietnam aviation authority fined VietJet Air US$960 in 2012 for organizing five women of candidates in a local beauty contest to perform a Hawaiian themed-dance without first gaining permission to celebrate its maiden flight to the tourist hub of Nha Trang.

On 9 February 2013, the airline launched its first international flight between Ho Chi Minh City and Bangkok, becoming the first Vietnamese private airline to enter the international market.

In February 2014, at the opening of that year's Singapore Air Show, the airline firmed up orders with Airbus for 60 A320 aircraft at a list price of $6.4 billion. Previously, the airline had signed a Memorandum of Understanding with Airbus for 92 planes in the A320 family.

In June 2015, at the Paris Air Show, VietJet ordered six additional Airbus A321 single-aisle jets worth $682 million at list prices from Airbus to meet demand on some of its busiest routes; VietJet purchased a further 30 later that year at the Dubai Airshow, which included 21 A321neos along with 9 A321ceos. In May 2016 during a state visit of US President Barack Obama, an order for 200 Boeing 737 MAX aeroplanes was signed, with deliveries to start in 2019. In September 2016, CEO Nguyen Thi Phuong Thao announced an order for 20 A321 single-aisle aircraft from Airbus. The signing took place during a state visit of French President Francois Hollande. During the 2018 Farnborough Airshow, Thai VietJet, VietJet's Thai subsidiary, ordered 100 Boeing 737 MAXs (80 MAX 10s and 20 MAX 8s) and 50 A321neos.

Public offering
The share price immediately rose by 20%, the maximum allowed for newly listed companies. The airline raised $167 million from the listing, making it the biggest IPO on the Vietnamese stock market to date and accounting for 1.5% of HOSE's capitalization at the time.

Financials
According to pre-audited financial statements for 2019, VietJet's air transport revenue reached VND41,097 billion. Profit before tax of air transport rose to VND3,936 billion, an increase of 21.4% in revenue and 29.3% in profit before tax year-on-year. Accumulated revenue was VND52,059 billion and consolidated profit was VND5,010 billion. VietJet's total assets increased to VND47,608 billion, and equity rising to VND17,661 billion, an increase of 26% year-on-year.

Destinations

VietJet Air serves 18 domestic and 26 international destinations.

Codeshare agreements
VietJet Air codeshares with Japan Airlines and its subsidiary Thai VietJet Air.

Fleet 
, VietJet Air operates the following aircraft:

Services
VietJet Air offers three service options (fares):

 Eco 
 Deluxe 
 Skyboss/Skyboss Business

Accidents and incidents

Since commencing operations, VietJet Air has only suffered non-fatal incidents:
19 June 2014: VietJet Air Flight 8861 from Hanoi to Da Lat mistakenly landed at Cam Ranh International Airport. The reason was revealed to be pilot error. There were two flights, one from Hanoi to Nha Trang and the other from Hanoi to Da Lat, but one of the aircraft experienced technical difficulties and the aircraft was switched to another. Everyone was informed except for the captain of the flight. Everyone involved was suspended for further investigation.

16 October 2014: VietJet Air Flight 8856 departing from Ho Chi Minh City to Nha Trang landed on the wrong runway. The ATC repeatedly told the pilot to land on runway 02L, the pilot also repeated the messages correctly but later landed on runway 20R. The captain and the first officer were suspended. 

2 April 2015: a disabled passenger flying back to Hanoi from Da Nang was denied service by two VietJet employees, citing "unable to move by herself" and "did not notify the ground crew at the airport in time". The carrier later had to publicly apologize to the passenger and fined each employee VND5 million.

30 September 2015: VietJet Air Flight 496, an Airbus A320-200 (registered VN-A650) suffered a bird strike incident while on approach to Noi Bai International Airport. The aircraft from Buon Ma Thuot Airport landed safely on runway 07R. The aircraft's nose radome sustained substantial damage.

28 January 2018: VietJet caused some controversy by putting models wearing bikinis on the flight bringing the Vietnam U-23 football team home. VietJet CEO Nguyễn Thị Phương Thảo later publicly apologized.

7 September 2018: VietJet Air Flight 1848 from Hanoi to Taichung flew through a hailstorm, causing damage to the cockpit window. The flight was forced to return to Hanoi.

29 November 2018: VietJet Air Flight 356, a newly-delivered Airbus A321neo (registered VN-A653), suffered a hard landing at Buon Ma Thuot Airport after arriving from Tan Son Nhat International Airport. The aircraft lost both tires on the nose gear. Six passengers were injured. The aircraft was later grounded, pending investigation and repairs. The pilots were later fired and suspended by the Civil Aviation Authority.

12 July 2019: VietJet Air Flight 615 from Nha Trang to Ho Chi Minh City entered a wrong taxiway upon landing, forcing an approaching aircraft to go-around. The incident is under investigation by the Aviation Authority.

14 June 2020: VietJet Air Flight 322 from Phu Quoc to Ho Chi Minh City skidded off the runway during landing at Tan Son Nhat International Airport, causing delays to other flights. Passengers on this flight were later evacuated. No one was injured. The airline said heavy rain due to Tropical Storm Nuri was the cause of this incident.

See also
 Thai VietJet Air

References

External links
Official website

Airlines of Vietnam
Airlines established in 2007
Companies based in Hanoi
Vietnamese brands
Low-cost carriers
Vietnamese companies established in 2007